The 2000 North Carolina Tar Heels football team represented the University of North Carolina at Chapel Hill as a member of the Atlantic Coast Conference ACC) during the 2000 NCAA Division I-A football season. Led by third-year head coach Carl Torbush, the Tar Heels played their home games at Kenan Memorial Stadium in Chapel Hill, North Carolina. North Carolina finished the season 6–5 overall and 3–5 in ACC play to tie for sixth place. Torbush was fired following the season.

Schedule

Roster

Coaching staff

References

North Carolina
North Carolina Tar Heels football seasons
North Carolina Tar Heels football